Juanito "Jun" Madarang Aristorenas (May 7, 1933 – September 15, 2000) was a Filipino actor, director, dancer, producer and writer. Aristorenas was known for his western roles, and had topbilled cowboy movies such as Sagupaan ng mga Patapon, Dugong Tigre, and Apat na Bagwis.

As an actor, Aristorenas has performed in movies such as Danilo Ronquillo: Cavite Boy, released in 1965, in which he portrayed Danilo Ronquillo, Rico Solitaryo (1966), and Bale-bale Kung Lumaban (1964). As a movie director, he has worked on movies such as Matalino man ang matsing na-iisahan din!, released in 2000, Cara y Cruz: Walang Sinasanto! (1996), and Marami Ka Pang Kakaining Bigas (1994).

Aristorenas has also written the story of "Matalino man ang matsing na-iisahan din!", released in 2000.

Personal life
Aristorenas was married to Virginia Gaerlan (April 21, 1938 – March 8, 1989), a former actress. Their sons, Robin (born 1964), Junar (born 1968) are former child actors.

Filmography

Pag Oras Mo, Oras Mo Na [Games of the Generals] (2000)
Matalino Man ang Matsing Na-iisahan Din! (2000)
Cara y Cruz: Walang Sinasanto! (1996) as Don Sebastian
Isa, Dalawa, Takbo! (1996) as Pompeyo
Melencio Magat: Dugo Laban sa Dugo (1996) as Gomer
Hagedorn (1996) as Mr. Angeles
Urban Rangers (1995) as Zaragosa
Marami Ka Pang Kakaining Bigas (1994) as Eric
Cuadro de Jack (1994) as Joe
Di na natuto (Sorry na, Puede ba?) (1993)
Markadong Hudas (1993) as Don Gonzalo
Victor Meneses: Dugong Kriminal (1993) as Mang Temiong
Masahol pa sa Hayop (1993) as Gen. Montalban
Leonardo Delos Reyes: Alyas Waway (1993) as Captain Llamas
Ano Ba Yan? (1992) as Lt. Joe Estrada
Baril at Balisong (1986)
Isang Kumot Tatlong Unan (1986)
Rocky Four-ma (1986)
Harabas at Kidlat (1980)
Harabas' Angels (1979) as Harabas
Ang Pagbabalik ni Harabas at Bulilit (1977)
She Devils in Chains (1976)
Mulawin (1976)
Hit and Run (1975)
KINGPin (1973)
San Cristobal (1972)
Apat na Bagwis (1972)
Elias, Basilio at Sisa (1972) as Elias
Putol na Kampilan (1972)
Guadalupe (1971)
Mandawi (1971)
Pulang Lupa (1971)
Dimasalang (1970) as Dimasalang
San Diego (1970)

3 Patapon (1969)
El Tigre (1969)
Samurai Master (1969)
The Magnificent Ifugao (1969)
The Samurai Fighters (1969)
3 Kilabot sa Barilan (1968) as Tiger
Cuadro de Jack (1968)
Deadly Jacks (1968)
De Colores (1968)
Eskinita 29 (1968)
Magnum Barracuda (1968) as Magnum Barracuda
Rancho Diablo (1968) as Professional Gambler
Simarron Brothers (1968)
Tigre Gitano (1968)
Valiente Brothers (1968)
Johnny West (1966) as Johnny West
Ang Babaing Ito ay Akin! (1966)
Katapat ng Bawat Lakas (1966)
Not for Hire (1966)
Rico Solitaryo (1966)
Soliman Brothers (1966)
Ben Barracuda (1965) as Ben Barracuda
Limbas: Walang gulat! (1965)
Tatlo sa Tatlo (1965)
Danilo Ronquillo: Cavite Boy (1965) as Danilo Ronquillo
Bale-bale Kung Lumaban (1964)
Dugong Tigre (1964) as Dugong Tigre
Bilis at Tapang (1964)
Sagupaan ng mga Patapon (1964)
Agent 69 (1964)
Labo-labo (1964)
Alias Golden Boy (1963)
Eternally (1957)
Turista (1957)

References

External links

1933 births
2000 deaths
Filipino film directors
Filipino film producers
Filipino male dancers
Filipino writers
Male actors from Manila
Artists from Metro Manila
Writers from Metro Manila
20th-century Filipino male actors
Filipino male film actors